Albert Vigna (29 January 1891 – 27 November 1970) was a Monegasque racing cyclist. He rode in the 1926 Tour de France.

References

1891 births
1970 deaths
Monegasque male cyclists
Place of birth missing